Allan Jack 'Stumpy' Woods (1906–1968) was an Australian rugby league footballer who played in the 1930s.

Career

Allan Woods was born in Manly, New South Wales on 20 July 1906. He is remembered as a second row forward who played with the St George Dragons for three seasons between 1930-1933, which included his appearance in the 1933 Grand Final.  He retired from rugby league after that match.

War service

Stumpy Woods was also a veteran of World War II, enlisting in 1941 and joining the 28 Australian Works Company, and attained the rank of Sergeant.

Allan 'Stumpy' Woods died on 4 April 1968, aged 61.

References

St. George Dragons players
Australian rugby league players
Australian military personnel of World War II
1906 births
1968 deaths
People from Manly, New South Wales
Rugby league second-rows
Rugby league players from Sydney